Headquartered in Washington, DC, the Federal Circuit Bar Association (FCBA) is an organization for the bar of the Court of Appeals for the Federal Circuit.  It functions as a forum for dialogue between bar members and the court and between government counsel and private practitioners.

The organization is headquartered in Washingtown, DC.

References

External links
 FCBA Homepage
 Federal Circuit Bar Journal

American bar associations
United States federal law